The Pyrenulaceae are a family of fungi in the order Pyrenulales. The family was first named by German botanist Gottlob Ludwig Rabenhorst in 1870. Species in the family have a widespread distribution, but are especially prevalent in the tropics, where they grow lichenized with green algae on bark.

References 

Pyrenulales
Lichen families
Taxa described in 1870
Taxa named by Gottlob Ludwig Rabenhorst